Barbadillo del Mercado is a municipality and town located in the province of Burgos, Castile and León, Spain. According to the 2004 INE census, the municipality had a population of 169.

References 

Municipalities in the Province of Burgos